Ejaculatory dysfunction can refer to:

 Premature ejaculation, an orgasm and ejaculation that is perceived to occur too quickly
 Delayed ejaculation, difficulty to achieve an orgasm and ejaculation
 Anorgasmia, an inability to achieve an orgasm and, in men, ejaculation

See also 
 Erectile dysfunction
 Sexual dysfunction